An animator is an artist who creates multiple images that give an illusion of movement when displayed in rapid sequence.

Animator may also refer to:

 Animator.ru, a Russian website
 "Animator" (song), a 2006 indie rock song
 Autodesk Animator, a 2D animation and painting program
 Animator (festival), an animated film festival
 Chaplain, an layperson who looks over spiritual care for students, has also been known as a spiritual animator, faith animator, or pastoral animator

See also
 Animation
 Reanimator (disambiguation)